{{DISPLAYTITLE:C25H38O4}}
The molecular formula C25H38O4 (molar mass: 402.57 g/mol) may refer to:

 Androstenediol dipropionate, or 5-androstenediol 3β,17β-dipropionate
 Oxprenoate, also called oxprenoic acid
 Terpestacin